The .442 Webley (also known as the ".442 Revolver Centre Fire" in Great Britain, the .442 Rook long (kangaroo) in Australia,  the "10.5x17mmR" or ".442 Kurz" in Europe, and ".44 Webley" or ".442 R.I.C." in the United States) is a British centrefire revolver cartridge.

History
Introduced in 1868, the .442 (11.2mm) Webley round was used in the Webley RIC revolver.  This was the standard service weapon of the Royal Irish Constabulary (RIC, hence the revolver's name), which were also chambered in (among others) .450 Adams and 476/.455. Lt. Col. George Custer is believed to have carried a pair of RIC revolvers (presented to him in 1869 by Lord Berkley Paget)  at the Battle of the Little Bighorn.

A black powder round, the .442 originally used a 15–19 grain (gr) (0.972–1.23 g) charge behind a 200–220 gr (13–14.3 g) bullet. This loading was later joined by a smokeless variety.

At one time, the .442 Webley was a popular chambering in self-defence or "pocket" guns (so named for being designed to be carried in a pocket, what today might be a known as a snubnose or carry gun), such as the widely copied Webley British Bulldog pocket revolver.

The cartridge was moderately effective, being roughly similar in power to the contemporary .38 S&W, .41 Colt, or .44 S&W American, and somewhat less potent than the later 7.65mm Parabellum, .38 Special  or .45 ACP. It was not very suitable at anything but close range.

Smokeless .442 Webley loads continued to be commercially offered in the U.S. until 1940 and in the United Kingdom and Europe until the 1950s.

See also
.44 Bull Dog
List of cartridges by caliber
11mm caliber
List of handgun cartridges

References

Sources
Barnes, Frank C., ed. by John T. Amber. ".44 Webley/.44 R.I.C.", in Cartridges of the World, pp. 170 & 177. Northfield, IL: DBI Books, 1972. .
__ and _. ".30 (7.65mm) Parabellum", in Cartridges of the World, p. 153. Northfield, IL: DBI Books, 1972. .
__ and _. ".38 Smith & Wesson", in Cartridges of the World, p. 163. Northfield, IL: DBI Books, 1972. .
__ and _. ".38 Smith & Wesson Special", in Cartridges of the World, p. 163. Northfield, IL: DBI Books, 1972. .
__ and _. ".41 Long Colt", in Cartridges of the World, p. 165. Northfield, IL: DBI Books, 1972. .
__ and _. ".44 Smith & Wesson American", in Cartridges of the World, p. 167. Northfield, IL: DBI Books, 1972. .
__ and _. ".45 Automatic", in Cartridges of the World, p. 171. Northfield, IL: DBI Books, 1972. .
Dowell, William Chipchase. The Webley Story. Kirkland, WA: Commonwealth Heritage Foundation, 1987.
Elman, Robert. Fired in Anger: The Personal Handguns of American Heroes and Villains. Garden City, NY: Doubleday & Company, 1968.
Ficken, H. R.. ''Webley's The British Bull Dog Revolver, Serial Numbering and Variations". Retrieved on 2006-08-03.

Pistol and rifle cartridges
British firearm cartridges
Weapons of Ireland
Police weapons
Weapons and ammunition introduced in 1868